Byars is a town in McClain County, Oklahoma, United States. The population was 255 at the 2010 census.

History
The present community of Byars is one mile southeast of the Camp Arbuckle site in what is now McClain County. Before Byars was established, there was a community called Johnsonville, named for a local rancher named Montford Johnson. Thomas B. Johnson, Chief Justice of the Chickasaw Nation, lived in Johnsonville, his daughter, Katie, married Nathan H. Byars, another local rancher.

In 1903, the Oklahoma Central Railroad (OCR) was very interested in building a community one mile south of Johnsonville, where the OCR was building an east–west line. Katie Byars and her husband donated land to be used for this purpose, despite opposition from their neighbors in Johnsonville. A post office named Byars was opened on April 9, 1903. Byars incorporated in 1906, and the OCR main line reached the town site in July 1908. At statehood in 1907, Byars had an official population of 537.

Geography

Byars is located along State Highway 59.

Demographics

As of the census of 2000, there were 280 people, 105 households, and 74 families residing in the town. The racial makeup of the town was 86.79% White, 10.36% Native American, 0.36% Asian, 0.36% from other races, and 2.14% from two or more races. Hispanic or Latino of any race were 1.79% of the population.

There were 105 households, out of which 35.2% had children under the age of 18 living with them, 52.4% were married couples living together, 12.4% had a female householder with no husband present, and 29.5% were non-families. 24.8% of all households were made up of individuals, and 15.2% had someone living alone who was 65 years of age or older. The average household size was 2.67 and the average family size was 3.16.

In the town, the population was spread out, with 29.3% under the age of 18, 8.2% from 18 to 24, 30.0% from 25 to 44, 16.8% from 45 to 64, and 15.7% who were 65 years of age or older. The median age was 35 years. For every 100 females, there were 87.9 males. For every 100 females age 18 and over, there were 94.1 males.

The median income for a household in the town was $20,357, and the median income for a family was $25,417. Males had a median income of $27,188 versus $20,179 for females. The per capita income for the town was $18,647. About 21.3% of families and 23.6% of the population were below the poverty line, including 31.7% of those under the age of 18 and 10.4% of those 65 or over.

Notes

References

External links
 Encyclopedia of Oklahoma History and Culture - Byars

Towns in McClain County, Oklahoma
Towns in Oklahoma
Populated places established in 1903
1903 establishments in Oklahoma Territory